Leandro Aparecido da Silva (born 8 April 1976) is a Brazilian equestrian. He competed in the individual dressage event at the 2008 Summer Olympics. In 2020, his license was suspended by Sociedad Hipica Paulista and he was put under investigation by the International Federation for Equestrian Sports, after a videos of Silva and his son mistreating ponies surfaced on the internet.

References

External links
 

1976 births
Living people
Brazilian male equestrians
Brazilian dressage riders
Olympic equestrians of Brazil
Equestrians at the 2008 Summer Olympics
Pan American Games medalists in equestrian
Pan American Games bronze medalists for Brazil
Equestrians at the 2011 Pan American Games
Equestrians at the 2015 Pan American Games
Equestrians at the 2019 Pan American Games
Sportspeople from Mato Grosso
Medalists at the 2015 Pan American Games
Medalists at the 2019 Pan American Games
South American Games gold medalists for Brazil
South American Games bronze medalists for Brazil
South American Games medalists in equestrian
Competitors at the 2014 South American Games
21st-century Brazilian people
20th-century Brazilian people